Adorf is a German surname. Notable people with the surname include:

Dirk Adorf (born 1969), German racing driver
Margit Adorf (born 1974), Estonian journalist and poet
Mario Adorf (born 1930), German actor and writer

German-language surnames